Cristina Irma Greve (born 20 July 1987) is an Argentine professional racing cyclist.

Major results

2005
 1st  Time trial, National Junior Road Championships
2006
 2nd Road race, National Road Championships
2008
 3rd Time trial, National Road Championships
2013
 2nd Time trial, National Road Championships
2014
 5th Time trial, South American Games
2015
 1st Points race, U.S. Vic Williams Memorial Grand Prix
 2nd Road race, National Road Championships
 5th Road race, Pan American Games
2016
 8th Time trial, Pan American Road Championships

See also
 List of 2015 UCI Women's Teams and riders

References

External links

1987 births
Living people
Argentine female cyclists
Place of birth missing (living people)
Cyclists at the 2015 Pan American Games
Pan American Games competitors for Argentina
21st-century Argentine women